The thirty-fourth edition of the Caribbean Series (Serie del Caribe) was played in . It was held from February 2 through February 9 with the champions teams from the Dominican Republic, Leones del Escogido; Mexico, Naranjeros de Hermosillo; Puerto Rico, Indios de Mayagüez, and Venezuela, Águilas del Zulia. The format consisted of 12 games, each team facing the other teams twice, and was played at Héctor Espino Baseball Stadium in Hermosillo, Mexico.

Summary

Final standings

Individual leaders

All-Star Team

See also
Ballplayers who have played in the Series

Sources
 Nuñez, José Antero (1994). Serie del Caribe de la Habana a Puerto La Cruz. JAN Editor.

External links
Estadísticas Serie del Caribe 1992 (Spanish)

International baseball competitions hosted by Mexico
1992
Caribbean
1992 in Mexican sports
1992 in Caribbean sport
Caribbean Series